Frank Keem Malcolm (April 3, 1893 – 1973) was a farmer and political figure in Saskatchewan. He represented Milestone from 1944 to 1948 in the Legislative Assembly of Saskatchewan as a Co-operative Commonwealth Federation (CCF) member.

He was born in Toronto, Ontario, the son of John A. Malcolm and Mary J. Walton, and was educated in London, Ontario and St. Thomas. In 1916, Malcolm married Ethel M. Dean. He also worked as a plumber, a probation officer and was a minister. Malcolm ran unsuccessfully as a Farmer-Labour candidate for the Gravelbourg seat in the provincial assembly in a 1935 by-election.

References 

1893 births
1973 deaths
Politicians from Toronto
Saskatchewan Co-operative Commonwealth Federation MLAs
20th-century Canadian politicians